Bradyrhizobium daqingense is a bacterium from the genus Bradyrhizobium.

References

External links
Type strain of Bradyrhizobium daqingense at BacDive -  the Bacterial Diversity Metadatabase

Nitrobacteraceae
Bacteria described in 2013